Fominka is a rural locality (a village) in Dobryansky District, Perm Krai, Russia. The population was 41 as of 2010. There are 3 streets.

Geography 
Fominka is located 25 km northeast of Dobryanka (the district's administrative centre) by road. Kyzh is the nearest rural locality.

References 

Rural localities in Dobryansky District